A Sting in the Tale is a 1989 Australian political satire film directed by Eugene Schlusser and starring Diane Craig and Gary Day.

Plot
Diane Lane (Diane Craig) is elected to Canberra as an MP. Her married lover, Barry Robbins (Gary Day), is Minister for Health and her best friend is journalist Louise Parker (Lynne Williams).

Barry wants to depose the current Prime Minister and tries to enlist the support of media baron Roger Monroe (Edwin Hodgeman). However Diane is angry at Monroe for suppressing news of negligence in a mining disaster which killed her father and twenty others.

Diane leaks a document to embarrass the government about its plans for media ownership. The Prime Minister appoints her as Minister to the Arts in order to control her.

Diane then discovers Monroe has planted someone in her office to watch her. She tries to bring down Monroe and become Australia's first female Prime Minister.

Cast
 Diane Craig as Diane Lane
 Gary Day as Barry Robbins
 Lynne Williams as Louise Parker
 Edwin Hodgeman as Monroe
 Don Barker as Prime Minister
 John Noble as Prime Minister's Minder
 Tony Mack as Michael Meadows
 Bob Newman as Permanent Secretary
 Gordon Goulding as Wilson Sinclair
 Patrick Edgeworth as Editor
 Gary Bishop as Leader of the Opposition
 Robert Leach as Speaker of the House

Production
The film was shot in Adelaide.

References

External links
 
 A Sting in the Tale at Oz Movies
 A Sting in the Tale at Australian Cinema
 A Sting in the Tale at Winding Road Entertainment (official page)

Australian comedy films
Australian satirical films
1989 films
Australian political satire films
1989 comedy films
1980s satirical films
1980s English-language films
1980s Australian films